The 1949 Baylor Bears football team represented Baylor University in the Southwest Conference (SWC) during the 1949 college football season. In their third and final season under head coach Bob Woodruff, the Bears compiled an 8–2 record (6–1 against conference opponents), finished in second place in the conference, were ranked No. 20 in the final AP Poll, and outscored all opponents by a combined total of 232 to 126. They played their home games at Municipal Stadium in Waco, Texas. Don Mouser was the team captain.

Schedule

References

Baylor
Baylor Bears football seasons
Baylor Bears football